, also known as  (alternatively spelled 譽田別命, 誉田別命, 品陀和気命, 譽田分命, 誉田別尊, 品陀別命) or , was the 15th (possibly legendary) Emperor of Japan, according to the traditional order of succession.

No firm dates can be assigned to Ōjin's life or reign, but he is traditionally considered to have reigned from 270 to 310. According to the Shinto religion and Buddhism in Japan, Emperor Ōjin is the divine spirit of the deity Hachiman (八幡神).

Legendary narrative
The Japanese have traditionally accepted this sovereign's historical existence, and a mausoleum (misasagi) for Ōjin is currently maintained. These chronicles include legends and myths, as well as potential historical facts that have since been exaggerated and/or distorted over time. The circumstances surrounding the future emperor's birth are controversial as they allegedly involve the invasion of the Korean Peninsula. It is said by the Kiki that Ōjin was conceived but unborn when his father Emperor Chūai died. Empress Jingū then became a de facto ruler who allegedly invaded a "promised land" (Korea) out of revenge, then returned three years later to the Japanese mainland to give birth. The records state that Ōjin was born to Empress Jingū in Tsukushi Province sometime in 201 AD, and was given the name . He became the crown prince at the age of four, but was not crowned Emperor until 270 AD at the age of 70. Emperor Ōjin supposedly lived in two palaces which are now located in present-day Osaka. His reign lasted 40 years until his death in 310 AD, in all he fathered 28 children with one spouse and ten consorts. His fourth son  Ōosazaki was later enthroned as the next emperor in 313 AD.

Known information

While the historical existence of Emperor Ōjin is debated among historians, there is a general consensus that he was "probably real". There is also an agreement that Ojin's three year conception period is mythical and symbolic, rather than realistic. William George Aston has suggested that this can be interpreted as a period of less than nine months containing three "years" (some seasons), e.g. three harvests. If Ōjin was an actual historical figure then historians have proposed that he ruled later than attested. Dates of his actual reign have been proposed to be as early as 370 to 390 AD, to as late as the early 5th century AD. At least one Japanese historian has cast doubt on this theory though, by revising a supporting statement given in 1972. In this new narrative Louis Perez states: "only kings and emperors after the reign of Ojin... ...are seen as historical figures". In either case there is also no evidence to suggest that the title tennō was used during the time to which Ōjin's reign has been assigned. It is certainly possible that he was a chieftain or local clan leader, and that the polity he ruled would have only encompassed a small portion of modern-day Japan. The name Ōjin-tennō was more than likely assigned to him posthumously by later generations.

While the actual site of Ōjin's grave is not known, this regent is traditionally venerated at a kofun-type Imperial tomb in Osaka. The Imperial Household Agency designates this location as Ōjin's mausoleum, and is formally named Eega no Mofushi no oka no misasagi. At some point Ōjin was made a guardian Kami of the Hata clan, and is now also deified as Hachiman Daimyōjin. Outside of the Kiki, the reign of Emperor Kinmei ( – 571 AD) is the first for which contemporary historiography has been able to assign verifiable dates. The conventionally accepted names and dates of the early Emperors were not confirmed as "traditional" though, until the reign of Emperor Kanmu between 737 and 806 AD.

Family

Emperor Ōjin's family allegedly consisted of 28 children, which include 2 unnamed princesses from a previous marriage. He had one spouse who bore him a son that would become the next Emperor, as well as 10 consorts.

Spouse & concubines

Issue

See also

 Emperor of Japan
 Hachiman
 List of Emperors of Japan
 Imperial cult

Notes

References

Further reading
 Aston, William George. (1896).  Nihongi: Chronicles of Japan from the Earliest Times to A.D. 697. London: Kegan Paul, Trench, Trubner. 
 Brown, Delmer M. and Ichirō Ishida, eds. (1979).  Gukanshō: The Future and the Past. Berkeley: University of California Press. ; 
 Chamberlain, Basil Hall. (1920). The Kojiki. Read before the Asiatic Society of Japan on April 12, May 10, and June 21, 1882; reprinted, May 1919. 
 Ponsonby-Fane, Richard Arthur Brabazon. (1959).  The Imperial House of Japan. Kyoto: Ponsonby Memorial Society. 
 Titsingh, Isaac. (1834). Nihon Ōdai Ichiran; ou,  Annales des empereurs du Japon.  Paris: Royal Asiatic Society, Oriental Translation Fund of Great Britain and Ireland. 
 Varley, H. Paul. (1980). Jinnō Shōtōki: A Chronicle of Gods and Sovereigns. New York: Columbia University Press. ; 
 Wakabayashi, Tadashi. (1995). Japanese loyalism reconstrued: Yamagata Daini's Ryūshi shinron of 1759. Honolulu: University of Hawaii Press. ; 

 
 

Year of birth missing
Year of death missing
Longevity myths
Japanese emperors
People of Kofun-period Japan
3rd-century monarchs in Asia
4th-century monarchs in Asia
3rd-century Japanese monarchs
4th-century Japanese monarchs
Hachiman faith